Al-Shorta or Shorta may refer to:

Football clubs 
 Al-Shorta SC, in Baghdad, Iraq
 Al-Shorta SC (Syria), in Damascus, Syria
 Shorta Aleppo SC, in Aleppo, Syria
 Al-Shorta Doha, former name of Al-Duhail SC in Qatar
 Ittihad El Shorta SC, in Cairo, Egypt
 Aliyat Al-Shorta SC, in Baghdad, Iraq

Other uses 
 Shurta, Arabic term for police
 Shorta (film), a 2020 Danish film known as Enforcement in English
 Al-Shorta Stadium, a former multi-use stadium in Baghdad, Iraq